The Breaux House is a historic mansion located at 401 Patriot Street in Thibodaux, Louisiana.

Built in the 1890s, the house is a single story frame Queen Anne Revival building with Eastlake gallery posts.

The building was listed on the National Register of Historic Places on March 5, 1986.

It is one of 14 individually NRHP-listed properties in the "Thibodaux Multiple Resource Area", which also includes:
Bank of Lafourche Building

Building at 108 Green Street
Chanticleer Gift Shop
Citizens Bank of Lafourche
Grand Theatre
Lamartina Building
McCulla House
Peltier House
Percy-Lobdell Building
Riviere Building
Riviere House
Robichaux House
St. Joseph Co-Cathedral and Rectory

See also
 National Register of Historic Places listings in Lafourche Parish, Louisiana

References

Houses on the National Register of Historic Places in Louisiana
Queen Anne architecture in Louisiana
Houses completed in 1890
Lafourche Parish, Louisiana
National Register of Historic Places in Lafourche Parish, Louisiana